House of Cards is an American political thriller streaming television series created by Beau Willimon. It is based on the 1989 novel of the same name by Michael Dobbs and an adaptation of the 1990 BBC series of the same name also from the novel. The first 13-episode season was released on February 1, 2013, on the streaming service Netflix. House of Cards is the first TV series to have been produced by a studio for Netflix.

House of Cards is set in Washington, D.C. and is the story of Frank Underwood (Kevin Spacey), an amoral politician and Democrat from South Carolina's 5th congressional district and his equally ambitious wife Claire Underwood (Robin Wright). Frank is passed over for appointment as Secretary of State but remains House Majority Whip so he initiates an elaborate plan to attain power, aided by Claire. The series deals with themes of ruthless pragmatism, manipulation, betrayal, and power.

House of Cards received positive reviews and many award nominations, including 33 Primetime Emmy Award nominations, among them Outstanding Drama Series, Outstanding Lead Actor for Spacey, and Outstanding Lead Actress for Wright. It is the first original online-only streaming television series to receive major Emmy nominations. The show also earned eight Golden Globe Award nominations, with Wright winning for Best Actress – Television Series Drama in 2014 and Spacey winning for Best Actor – Television Series Drama in 2015.

In 2017, following allegations of sexual misconduct against Spacey, Netflix terminated their relationship with the actor. The sixth and final season was produced and released in 2018 without his involvement.

Plot

Season 1 (2013)

Frank Underwood, a power-hungry Democratic congressman from South Carolina and House majority whip, celebrates the 2012 election of President Garrett Walker, who had agreed to appoint him Secretary of State in exchange for his support. However, Underwood learns that the President wants him to promote his agenda in Congress and will not honor their agreement. Inwardly seething, Underwood presents himself as a helpful lieutenant to Walker. In reality, Underwood begins an elaborate plan behind the President's back. Frank's wife Claire runs an NGO, the Clean Water Initiative, which she uses to cultivate her own power; she seeks to expand its scope to the international stage, often using Frank's connections. Claire shares her husband's cold-hearted, ruthless pragmatism and lust for power, and they frequently scheme together to ensure the success of each other's ventures. They both work with Remy Danton, a corporate lobbyist and former Underwood staffer, to secure funds for their operations and expand their influence.

Underwood begins a symbiotic, and ultimately sexual, relationship with Zoe Barnes, a young political reporter, secretly feeding her damaging stories about his political rivals to sway public opinion as needed. Meanwhile, he manipulates Peter Russo, a troubled alcoholic congressman from Pennsylvania, into helping him undermine Walker's pick for Secretary of State, Senator Michael Kern. Underwood eventually has Kern replaced with his own choice, Senator Catherine Durant. Underwood also uses Russo in a plot to end a teachers' strike and pass an education bill, which improves Underwood's standing with Walker. Because the new Vice President is the former Governor of Pennsylvania, a special election is to be held for his successor. Underwood helps Russo get clean and props up his candidacy, but later uses sex worker Rachel Posner to break his sobriety and trigger his downfall shortly before the election. When Russo decides to come clean about his role in Underwood's schemes, Frank kills Russo and stages his death as a suicide. With the special election in chaos, Underwood convinces the Vice President to step down and run for his old position of governor – leaving the Vice Presidency open to Underwood, as was his plan all along. Underwood is introduced to Missouri billionaire Raymond Tusk, Walker's friend and advisor. Tusk reveals that he has been influencing Walker's decisions all along and convinced him to cancel the original agreement, and explains he will influence Walker to nominate Underwood for vice president if he does a favor benefiting Tusk's interests. Underwood counter-proposes to Tusk that they work together to fulfill both their interests, which Tusk accepts. Meanwhile, after ending their affair, Zoe begins piecing together clues about Underwood's various plots. The season ends when Underwood accepts the nomination for Vice President of the United States.

Season 2 (2014)

Zoe and two colleagues, Lucas Goodwin and Janine Skorsky, continue investigating Frank and ultimately locate Rachel. As a protective measure, Frank's aide Doug Stamper brings Rachel to a safe house while Frank lures Zoe to a Metro station and, unseen by witnesses or security cameras, pushes her in front of an oncoming train. Zoe's death compels Janine to abandon the investigation, but Lucas continues the search alone. He solicits the help of a hacker to retrieve Frank's text history. However, the hacker, Gavin Orsay, actually works for Doug and frames Lucas for cyberterrorism. Later, Gavin uses Rachel to extort Doug. Rachel, fearing potential harm and Doug's growing obsession with her, ambushes Doug and leaves him for dead, fleeing into hiding.

After Frank begins his vice presidential duties, Claire becomes close with the First Lady and learns Walker's marriage is strained. Meanwhile, Frank aims to drive a wedge between Walker and Tusk. He meets Xander Feng, a Chinese businessman and ally of Tusk's, to engage in back-channel negotiations that Frank intentionally scuttles at the expense of Tusk's credibility. In the resulting trade war with China, Tusk opposes Walker's efforts to deal with the crisis and begins having a tribal casino funnel money into Republican PACs in retaliation. When Frank discovers that Feng is the source of the donations, he gets Feng to end his partnership with Tusk in exchange for a lucrative contract for a bridge over Long Island Sound.

The Justice Department investigates the White House's ties to Feng and Tusk. Frank manipulates Walker into volunteering his travel records, which reveal his visits to a marriage counselor and raise questions about whether the donations were discussed. Wishing to avoid public disclosure of his personal issues, Walker has the White House Counsel coach the counselor, which the special prosecutor interprets as witness tampering. As the House Judiciary Committee begins drafting articles of impeachment, both Walker and Frank offer Tusk a presidential pardon in exchange for implicating each other. Tusk sides with Walker at first, leaving Frank no other option than to regain the president's trust as a friend. Walker then calls off his deal with Tusk, who testifies against him. With Walker forced to resign, Frank is sworn in as the 46th President of the United States.

Season 3 (2015)

Six months into his presidency, Frank pushes for a controversial jobs program called America Works. Determined not to be a "placeholder" President, Underwood reverses his previous pledge and runs in the 2016 election, competing against Heather Dunbar in the Democratic primaries.

Meanwhile, Claire is named the U.S. Ambassador to the United Nations and faces a crisis in the Jordan Valley, which pits Frank against Russian President Viktor Petrov. When Petrov has an American gay rights activist arrested in Russia, the Underwoods persuade him to secure a release. However, Petrov demands that the activist apologize on Russian television, leading the activist to kill himself while being visited by Claire. Later, after Russian troops are killed in the Jordan Valley, Petrov convinces Frank to remove Claire as Ambassador in exchange for a peaceful resolution. Claire resigns, giving the reason that she wants to be more active in Frank's campaign.

When Frank refuses to reinstate Doug as his Chief of Staff, Doug appears to switch sides and begins working for Dunbar. Gavin helps Doug track down Rachel and delivers findings purporting that she is dead, causing Doug to suffer a relapse. When Gavin reveals that Rachel is really alive, Doug brutalizes him into divulging her location. Doug finds Rachel living under a false identity in New Mexico, drives her into the desert, and eventually kills her. He returns to work as Frank's Chief of Staff after Remy resigns.

Throughout the season, a writer named Thomas Yates is hired by Frank to write a biography for the purpose of promoting America Works. Yates, a fiction writer with a dark past of his own, decides to put a different spin on the book and writes less about Frank and more about his marriage with Claire. Yates reads Frank a prologue that he does not understand at first, but agrees is a decent beginning. By the end of the season, Yates has the first chapter written and Frank, not liking the direction the book is taking, fires Yates. By the season finale, tensions between the Underwoods reach a point where Claire states her intent to leave Frank.

Season 4 (2016)

Claire relocates to Dallas and runs for Congress in her home district. The incumbent, Doris Jones, plans to retire and endorse her daughter Celia as her successor. Claire offers them federal funding for a key Planned Parenthood clinic in exchange for stepping down, but they refuse the offer. Frank wins back Claire's support by promising not to sabotage her campaign in Texas, but he later publicly endorses Celia in his State of the Union address. Frank and Claire travel to South Carolina for a primary, but a series of scandals causes Frank to narrowly lose the state to Dunbar. Frank discovers that Claire had been leaking information to Dunbar, and she threatens to continue unless he names her as his running mate. Frank refuses.

Lucas Goodwin is released from prison, and seeks revenge against Frank for having him framed and Zoe Barnes killed. He explains his story to Dunbar, but she turns him away. Desperate, he attempts to assassinate Frank, severely wounding the president in the abdomen and killing bodyguard Edward Meechum, but not before Meechum fatally wounds Lucas. While Frank remains comatose, Donald Blythe is sworn in as Acting President of the United States. Blythe is indecisive during a military crisis involving Russia, and turns to Claire for guidance. Claire goes against Frank's wishes by convincing Blythe to involve China and secure a meeting with Petrov, where she brokers an ambitious peace deal. Doug leaks information about Dunbar's secret meeting with Lucas and forces her to suspend her campaign. Frank recovers and resumes his position as president, agreeing to put Claire on the ticket for the upcoming election.

Tom Hammerschmidt, Zoe and Lucas's former news editor, digs deeper into the latter's claims of Frank's misdeeds. He approaches Remy and, with his help, starts to piece together Frank's corruption. Tom also meets with Walker, convincing him to help by appealing to his anger for being forced to resign. Remy Danton and Jackie Sharp also decide to go on the record against Frank to lend credibility to the story. An American family is kidnapped in Tennessee by two supporters of a radical Islamist group called the Islamic Caliphate Organization (ICO), who agree to negotiate only with the ambitious Republican nominee, Governor Will Conway. Frank invites Conway to the White House to assist in the negotiations as a publicity stunt, and Conway helps buy critical time in locating the suspects. However, tensions between the Conways and Underwoods lead to the governor ending his role in the crisis.

Frank and Claire allow the kidnappers to speak to the deposed leader of ICO, Yusuf al Ahmadi, after successfully obtaining the release of two of the hostages. Instead of defusing the situation as he agreed, al Ahmadi urges the kidnappers to kill the remaining hostage and broadcast the killing to the public. Meanwhile, Hammerschmidt publishes his story and threatens to end Frank's campaign weeks before the election. Claire urges Frank to use a heavier hand in the situation, and they decide to fight back by creating chaos. Frank addresses the public declaring that the nation is at total war, ordering the full force of the military be used to combat global terrorism regardless of the cost. The season ends with Frank and Claire watching the live execution of the hostage together, and Claire breaking the fourth wall for the first time by looking into the camera along with Frank.

Season 5 (2017)

In the weeks before the 2016 election, Frank uses ICO as a pretext to enacting martial law in urban areas and consolidating polling places in key states. Done mainly through back channels with Democratic governors, this is officially done in the name of safety, but in practice disenfranchises rural Republican voters. To keep the strategy of fear going, Doug blackmails hacker Aidan Macallan into launching a massive cyberattack on the NSA, slowing down Internet traffic and wiping out hundreds of thousands of files. The Underwood Administration pins the attack on ICO. On Election Day, the result hinges on Pennsylvania, Tennessee, and Ohio. The early returns seem to favor Conway. Underwood's political machine stages a terrorist attack in Knoxville, Tennessee, which is pinned on a local suspected ICO sympathizer. With Pennsylvania secured by Conway and Ohio seeming to swing his way, Frank unofficially calls Conway directly to concede. However, this is merely a tactic to put Conway off guard, as the Underwoods contact Ohio's governor and convince him to close the polls early on the pretense of a terrorist threat. Ohio and Tennessee refuse to certify the election, and neither candidate reaches the requisite number of electoral votes.

Nine weeks after the unresolved election, the Twelfth Amendment is invoked, with the vote being put up to members of Congress. During a meeting with the Congressional Black Caucus, cracks begin to appear in Conway's facade as he loses his cool. In spite of this, Frank's own baggage and 12% approval rating only allows him a tie with Conway in the House, while Claire manages to secure the Senate vote, becoming Acting President of the United States. In light of the tie, Claire orders a special election for Ohio and Tennessee. Meanwhile, Jane Davis, a low-ranking Commerce Department official who has a wide-ranging network of connections and influence, begins working closely with the Underwoods. As a private citizen for the time being, Frank attends a meeting of powerful men at a secret society known as Elysian Fields, in an effort to secure their influence for votes in the upcoming special election. Meanwhile, Conway has a mental breakdown on his private plane due to feeling that the election was stolen from him. Eventually, this and other leaks from his campaign are slowly dripped to the media in a manner that seems unconnected to the Underwoods. Seeing that his candidate is losing, Conway's campaign manager, Mark Usher, switches sides to the Underwoods. The Underwood ticket wins both Ohio and Tennessee, and Frank is sworn in as president and Claire as vice president.

Meanwhile, Hammerschmidt continues to investigate Zoe's death, and is given information by an unknown leaker within the White House. Major document dumps are made available to Hammerschmidt, which, among other charges, prompts an impeachment hearing against Frank. In response, the Underwoods set up extensive surveillance on all White House personnel. Eventually, the leaker makes a voice-modulated call to Hammerschmidt, implicating Doug in Zoe's murder. The Underwoods convince Doug to take the fall for killing Zoe, and the leaker is revealed to be Frank himself. The leaks are revealed to be part of Frank's master plan to resign the presidency to Claire, believing his thirst for power can be better achieved in the private sector, working alongside his wife's presidency. Frank, concerned about Secretary Durant's intention to testify at the impeachment hearing, pushes her down a short flight of stairs upon accepting her resignation, hospitalizing her. Claire poisons Yates with an overdose of Gelsemium provided to her by Jane, concerned that he knows too much. Finally, contractors working for the Underwoods eliminate LeAnn by ramming her car off the road into a guard rail. Frank resigns as president, leaving Claire as the 47th president of the United States. The two await the proper moment for Claire to pardon him. This comes in the form of a military special operations unit finding and taking out the leader of ICO, which moves media focus away from Frank. Standing in the Oval Office, Claire appears to reconsider pardoning Frank, and ignores multiple concerned calls from him regarding the matter. The season ends with Claire ignoring Frank's call, then breaking the fourth wall to tell the viewers, "My turn."

Season 6 (2018)

One hundred days after Claire takes office, she faces increased scrutiny, particularly in light of her husband's death following his resignation. The brother-sister duo of Bill and Annette Shepherd seek to influence Claire. The Shepherds are connected with Mark Usher, whom Claire has made Vice President, and who is having an affair with Annette. Annette's son Duncan puts pressure on Claire through his media company, Gardner Analytics. Claire and the Shepherds battle over deregulation measures, and Claire uses a chemical leak from one of the Shepherd's operations to embarrass the two. Doug, meanwhile, is in therapy following his confession to Zoe's murder, and Claire uses Assistant Director Green and his psychiatrist to monitor him.

The Shepherds decide to influence Claire by other means, including through a Supreme Court justice they convince her to nominate. They and Seth Grayson also develop a mobile application which can secretly be used to monitor the user's activity, including their location. Secretary of State Durant also comes within the Shepherds' sphere of influence, and they persuade her to speak with prosecutors investigating the Underwoods as the Shepherds become increasingly distant from Claire. As Durant's testimony proves more threatening, Claire and Jane Davis plot to assassinate her, but she fakes her death and flees the country. Following Durant's fake death, Claire and President Petrov forge a deal on Syria. Claire then discovers that Durant is alive and living in France with Petrov's help. Following this, Claire disappears for three weeks, prompting questions of her ability to lead, and leading Usher to plan to use the 25th Amendment to remove her from office. Claire foils Usher's plan and fires her Cabinet, replacing it with an all-female Cabinet, much to Annette's surprise. Annette plans to use Claire's prior abortions against her, but Claire retaliates by revealing to Duncan he is not Annette's biological son.

With her new Cabinet in place, Claire decides to undertake a new, progressive, agenda. The Shepherds, meanwhile, continue to plot her downfall, enlisting the help of Brett Cole, an ambitious Congressman who seeks to become Speaker of the House. They also seek the help of Doug, but he refuses, initially. Doug meets with Hammerschmidt, providing him with information on Frank's actions. Determined to strike back against her enemies, Claire frames Usher for Yates's murder, claiming he colluded with Russia to do so. She also has Hammerschmidt, Davis, and Durant killed. Claire then reveals to Doug that she is pregnant with Frank's child, who will become his heir even though Frank secretly left his assets to Doug.

Four months after the murders, Claire reverts to her maiden name and continues her progressive agenda. Annette, now strained from Bill, plots with Usher, no longer Vice President, to assassinate Claire. She asks Doug to perpetrate the act, but he is reluctant, mainly desiring to protect Frank's legacy. Claire, through now-Speaker Cole, blackmails Justice Abruzzo into recusing himself in a case dealing with her power to launch nuclear weapons. Janine Skorsky and Doug continue to work to uncover the Underwoods, with Doug leaking contents of Frank's secret audio diary while Claire blames everything on Frank. Claire then uses the pretense of ICO obtaining a nuclear weapon to create a crisis, leading the Shepherds and Doug to accelerate their plans. After sending a copy of Frank's audio and letter opener to Claire, Doug visits her in the Oval Office where he admits that he killed Frank because he was undermining his own legacy. Doug threatens and wounds Claire with the letter opener, but when he draws back, she grabs it and stabs him in the stomach. As he lies bleeding on the floor, she covers his mouth and suffocates him, completely unaware that, thanks to Doug, journalist Janine Skorsky is going to expose her crimes.

Cast and characters

 Kevin Spacey as Francis J. "Frank" Underwood, a Democrat from South Carolina's 5th congressional district. He is House Majority Whip in season one, Vice President of the United States in season two, 46th President of the United States in seasons three to five, and the First Gentleman of the United States in season five. (seasons 1–5)
 Robin Wright as Claire Underwood, Frank's wife. She runs the Clean Water Initiative, a nongovernmental organization, in season one before giving it up to become Second Lady of the United States in season two. She then becomes United States Ambassador to the United Nations in season three and First Lady of the United States in seasons three to five. In season five, she is briefly acting President of the United States before becoming Vice President of the United States and finally, becomes the 47th President of the United States at the end of the season.
 Michael Kelly as Douglas "Doug" Stamper, Underwood's unwaveringly loyal White House Chief of Staff and confidant. He is temporarily replaced by Remy Danton as chief of staff after his injury for most of season three, but returns as his new chief of staff at the end of the season.
 Jayne Atkinson as Catherine "Cathy" Durant, a Democratic Senator from Louisiana and Secretary of State.
 Corey Stoll as Peter Russo, a Democratic congressman from Pennsylvania's 1st congressional district and recovering addict. (season 1; guest season 4)
 Kate Mara as Zoe Barnes, a reporter for The Washington Herald (and later Slugline). She forms an intimate relationship with Frank Underwood, her political informant, who in turn uses her as a mouthpiece to leak stories to the press and irk his political rivals. (season 1; guest seasons 2 and 4)
 Sandrine Holt as Gillian Cole, the leader of a grass-roots organization called World Well that provides clean water to developing countries. (season 1; guest season 2)
 Kristen Connolly as Christina Gallagher, a congressional staffer and personal assistant to President Walker, and lover to Peter Russo. (seasons 1–2)
 Rachel Brosnahan as Rachel Posner, a prostitute trying to make a better life for herself using Stamper. (seasons 1–3)
 Sebastian Arcelus as Lucas Goodwin, an editor at The Washington Herald and later Zoe's boyfriend. (seasons 1–2 and 4)
 Mahershala Ali as Remy Danton, a lawyer for Glendon Hill and lobbyist, who works for natural gas company SanCorp in season one and Raymond Tusk in season two. He worked in Underwood's congressional office as Communications Director prior to the series, and after severing ties with Tusk, and serves as Underwood's chief of staff for most of season three until quitting at the end of the season. (seasons 1–4)
 Nathan Darrow as Edward Meechum, a member of the United States Capitol Police and the Underwoods' bodyguard and driver. (seasons 1–4)
 Reg E. Cathey as Freddy Hayes, the owner of Freddy's BBQ, and one of Underwood's few true friends and confidants. When Raymond Tusk exposes Freddy's criminal past, Freddy loses out on a franchise opportunity; and he eventually gets and leaves a job as a White House groundskeeper. (seasons 1–4)
 Michel Gill as Garrett Walker, the 45th President of the United States, and former Governor of Colorado. He trusts Underwood as a close adviser and lieutenant, but remains blind to his machinations. (seasons 1–2, 4–5)
 Sakina Jaffrey as Linda Vasquez, President Walker's White House Chief of Staff. (seasons 1–2; guest season 6) 
 Constance Zimmer as Janine Skorsky, a reporter for The Washington Herald. (seasons 1–2, 6; guest season 4)
 Gerald McRaney as Raymond Tusk, a billionaire businessman with a wide network of influence, although he prefers to live modestly. (seasons 1–2, 4–5)
 Boris McGiver as Tom Hammerschmidt, the editor-in-chief of The Washington Herald. He opens an investigation into the secret dealings of Frank and his inner circle in season four. (seasons 1–2, 4–6)
 Jimmi Simpson as Gavin Orsay, a computer hacker turned reluctant FBI informant, who works secretly with Doug Stamper in exchange for help escaping the country. (seasons 2–3)
 Mozhan Marnò as Wall Street Telegraph reporter Ayla Sayyad. She is assigned to the White House and does freelance investigative reporting. (seasons 2–3)
 Molly Parker as Jacqueline "Jackie" Sharp, a Democratic congresswoman from California, who succeeded Frank as majority whip. She also briefly ran for the Democratic nomination for president in season three. (seasons 2–4)
 Elizabeth Marvel as Heather Dunbar, a lawyer and Solicitor General of the United States in the Walker administration. She runs against Underwood for the Democratic nomination. (seasons 2–4)
 Derek Cecil as Seth Grayson, a political operative who becomes press secretary for Vice President Underwood through blackmail. (seasons 2–6)
 Paul Sparks as Thomas Yates, a successful author whom Frank asks to write a book about the America Works jobs program. He stays on as a speech writer and Claire's lover. (seasons 3–5)
 Kim Dickens as Kate Baldwin, the chief political reporter of the Wall Street Telegraph. She replaces Sayyad at the White House after Seth Grayson dismisses Sayyad for protocol violations. (seasons 3–5)
 Lars Mikkelsen as Viktor Petrov, the President of Russia. (seasons 3–6)
 Joel Kinnaman as Will Conway, the Republican Governor of New York and nominee for President of the United States running against Frank. (seasons 4–5)
 Neve Campbell as LeAnn Harvey, a Texas-based political consultant Claire hires to run her congressional campaign. She later becomes the campaign manager for the Underwoods for the 2016 election. (seasons 4–5)
 Dominique McElligott as Hannah Conway, the wife of New York Governor and Republican presidential nominee Will Conway. (seasons 4–5)
 Damian Young as Aidan Macallan, a data scientist and NSA contractor, who is friends with LeAnn Harvey. (seasons 4–5)
 Korey Jackson as Sean Jeffries, a young reporter at the Washington Herald working under Hammerschmidt. (season 5)
 James Martinez as Alex Romero, a Democratic congressman who leads the House Intelligence Committee's investigation into Frank's alleged abuse of power. (season 5)
 Campbell Scott as Mark Usher, Conway's campaign manager. He later joins the Underwoods' inner circle as a "special advisor" and becomes the Vice President of the United States under Claire Underwood. (seasons 5–6)
 Patricia Clarkson as Jane Davis, Deputy Undersecretary of Commerce for international trade. She is very well connected and able to successfully negotiate back-channel dealings for the Underwoods. (seasons 5–6)
 Diane Lane as Annette Shepherd, a former childhood classmate of Claire's who is the co-head and public face of Shepherd Unlimited, a leading industrial conglomerate that has worked for years to shape and influence U.S. policy. (season 6)
 Greg Kinnear as Bill Shepherd, Annette's behind the scenes billionaire brother and co-head of Shepherd Unlimited that prefers to stay out of the limelight but is ruthless when it comes to playing politics to suit his business needs. (season 6)
 Cody Fern as Duncan Shepherd, Annette's ambitious and devoted son who represents the next generation of DC power players. (season 6)

Production

Conception

The series played a role as one of the earliest shows to launch in the "streaming era." Independent studio Media Rights Capital (MRC), founded by Mordecai Wiczyk and Asif Satchu, producer of films such as Babel, purchased the rights to House of Cards with the intention to create a series. While finishing production on his 2008 film The Curious Case of Benjamin Button, David Fincher's agent showed him House of Cards, a BBC series starring Ian Richardson. Fincher was interested in producing a potential series with Eric Roth. Fincher said that he was interested in doing television because of its long-form nature, adding that working in film does not allow for complex characterizations the way that television allows. "I felt for the past ten years that the best writing that was happening for actors was happening in television. And so I had been looking to do something that was longer form," Fincher stated.

MRC approached different networks about the series, including HBO, Showtime and AMC, but Netflix, hoping to launch its own original programming, outbid the other networks. Ted Sarandos, Netflix's chief content officer, looked at the data of Netflix users' streaming habits and concluded that there was an audience for Fincher and Spacey. "It looked incredibly promising," he said, "kind of the perfect storm of material and talent." In finding a writer to adapt the series, Fincher stated that they needed someone who could faithfully translate parliamentary politics to Washington." Beau Willimon, who has served as an aide to Chuck Schumer, Howard Dean and Hillary Clinton, was hired and completed the pilot script in early 2011. Willimon saw the opportunity to create an entirely new series from the original and deepen its overall story.

The project was first announced in March 2011, with Kevin Spacey attached to star and serve as an executive producer. Fincher was announced as director for the first two episodes, from scripts by Willimon. Netflix ordered 26 episodes to air over two seasons.

Spacey called Netflix's model of publishing all episodes at once a "new perspective." He added that Netflix's commitment to two full seasons gave the series greater continuity. "We know exactly where we are going," he said. In a speech at the Edinburgh International Television Festival, he also noted that while other networks were interested in the show, they all wanted a pilot, whereas Netflix – relying solely on their statistics – ordered the series directly. In January 2016, show creator, executive producer and showrunner Beau Willimon's departure following season 4 was announced. He was replaced by Frank Pugliese and Melissa James Gibson, both of whom had begun writing for the series in season 3.

Casting

Fincher stated that every main cast member was their first choice. In the first read through, he said "I want everybody here to know that you represent our first choice — each actor here represents our first choice for these characters. So do not fuck this up." Spacey, whose last regular television role was in the series Wiseguy, which ran from 1987 until 1990, responded positively to the script. He then played Richard III at The Old Vic, which Fincher said was "great training." Spacey supported the decision to release all of the episodes at once, believing that this type of release pattern will be increasingly common with television shows. He said, "When I ask my friends what they did with their weekend, they say, 'Oh, I stayed in and watched three seasons of Breaking Bad or it's two seasons of Game of Thrones." He was officially cast on March 18, 2011. Robin Wright was approached by Fincher to star in the series when they worked together in The Girl with the Dragon Tattoo. She was cast as Claire Underwood in June 2011. Kate Mara was cast as Zoe Barnes in early February 2012. Mara's sister, Rooney, worked with Fincher in The Girl with the Dragon Tattoo, and when Kate Mara read the part of Zoe, she "fell in love with the character" and asked her sister to "put in a word for me with Fincher." The next month, she got a call for an audition.

Filming

Locations
Principal photography for the first season began in January 2012 in Harford County, Maryland, on the Eastern seaboard of the United States.

Among the numerous exteriors filmed in Baltimore, but set in Washington, D.C., are: Francis and Claire Underwood's residence, Zoe Barnes' apartment, Freddy's BBQ Rib Joint, The Clean Water Initiative building where Claire works, The Washington Herald offices, the Washington Opera House, the Secretary of State's building, Hotel Cotesworth, The Georgetown Hotel, Werner's Bar, Tio Pepe's, the DuPont Circle Bar, as well as scenes set in other locations, including Peter Russo's campaign rally in Pennsylvania and The Sentinel (military academy)'s Francis J. Underwood Library and Waldron Hall in South Carolina.

The warehouse is used for the filming of some of the most iconic scenes of the series, such as the full-scale reconstruction of most of the West Wing of the White House, including the Oval Office, the Congressional offices and corridors, the large 'Slugline' open-plan office interior, and domestic interiors such as the large townhouse rooms of the Underwood residence and a large loft apartment. Extensive filming for season 5 was also done at the Maryland Historical Society in Mount Vernon, Baltimore.

The series uses green screen to augment the live action, inserting views of outdoor scenes in windows and broadcast images on TV monitors, often in post-production. The Production Designer, Steve Arnold, also describes in detail the use of a three-sided green screen to insert street scenes outside car windows, with synchronized LED screens above the car (and out of camera shot), that emit the appropriate light onto the actors and parts of the car, such as window frames: "All the driving in the show, anything inside the vehicle is done on stage, in a room that is a big three-sided green screen space. The car does not move, the actors are in the car, and the cameras are set up around them. We have very long strips of LED monitors hung above the car. We had a camera crew go to Washington, D.C. to drive around and shoot plates for what you see outside when you're driving. And that is fed into the LED screens above the car. So as the scene is progressing, the LED screens are synched up to emit interactive light to match the light conditions you see in the scenery you're driving past (that will be added in post). All the reflections on the car windows, the window frames and door jambs is being shot while we're shooting the actors in the car. Then in post the green screens are replaced with the synced up driving plates, and it works really well. It gives you the sense of light passing over the actors' faces, matching the lighting that is in the image of the plate".

In June 2014, filming of three episodes in the UN Security Council chamber was vetoed by Russia at the last minute. However the show was able to film in other parts of the UN Building. In August 2014, the show filmed a "mock-motorcade scene" in Washington, D.C. In December 2014, the show filmed in Española, Santa Fe, and Las Vegas, New Mexico.

Tax credits
According to the Maryland Film Office, the state provided millions in tax credits to subsidize the production costs.
 For season 1, the company received a final tax credit of $11.6 million. Production costs were $63 million, more than 1,800 Maryland businesses were involved, and nearly 2,200 Marylanders were hired with a $138 million economic impact.
 For season 2, the company was reported to expect to get a tax credit of about $15 million because filming costs were more than $55 million. There were nearly 2,000 Maryland businesses benefitting from the production and more than 3,700 Marylanders were hired with a $120 million estimated economic impact.
 For season 3, the company filed a letter of intent to film, and estimated costs and economic impact similar to season 2. Under the 2014 formula, "the show would qualify for up to $15 million in tax credits."

Final season and firing of Spacey
On October 11, 2017, The Baltimore Sun reported that House of Cards had been renewed for a sixth season and that filming would begin by the end of October 2017. On October 29, actor Anthony Rapp publicly stated that lead actor Spacey had made a sexual advance on him at a 1986 party when Rapp was 14. The following day, Netflix announced that the upcoming sixth season of House of Cards would be its last. Multiple sources stated that the decision to end the series was made prior to Rapp's accusation, but the announcement nevertheless caused suspicions for its timing. The following day, it was announced that production on the season would be temporarily suspended, according to an official joint statement from Netflix and MRC, "to give us time to review the current situation and to address any concerns of our cast and crew". On November 3, 2017, Netflix announced that they would no longer be associated with Spacey in any capacity whatsoever. On December 4, 2017, Ted Sarandos, Netflix's chief content officer, announced that production would restart in 2018 with Robin Wright in the lead, and revealed that the final season of the show would now consist of eight episodes. Spacey was removed from the cast and as executive producer. In 2019, the last remaining related criminal charges against him were dropped.

On December 24, 2018, Spacey posted an unofficial short film titled Let Me Be Frank to his YouTube channel, in which, in-character as Francis "Frank" Underwood, he denied the allegations and stated that his character was not in fact dead. The video has been described in the media as "bizarre", "extraordinarily odd", "unsettling", and "alarming"; several actors — including Patricia Arquette, Ellen Barkin, and Rob Lowe — have criticized and ridiculed it on Twitter. As of September 2020, the video has over 12 million views, with 277,000 likes and 74,000 dislikes. Spacey posted a follow-up short film to Let Me Be Frank, titled KTWK (Kill Them with Kindness), to his YouTube channel on December 24, 2019.

Release

Broadcast
In Australia, where Netflix was not available prior to 2015, the series was broadcast on Showcase, premiering on May 7, 2013. Australian subscription TV provider Foxtel, and owner of Showcase, offered the entire first season to Showcase subscribers via their On Demand feature on Foxtel set-top boxes connected to the internet, as well as through their Xbox 360, Internet TV, and mobile (Foxtel Go) services. Although the entire season was made available, it maintained its weekly timeslot on Showcase. Season two returned to Showcase on February 15, 2014. As with season one, the entire season was made available on demand to Showcase subscribers while also retaining a weekly timeslot. The series has also been made available to non-Foxtel subscribers through Apple's Apple TV service. Prior to Netflix's Australian launch on March 28, 2015, Netflix renounced Showcase's rights to House of Cards, with season 3 premiering on Netflix at launch.

In New Zealand, where Netflix was unavailable prior to 2015, season 1 premiered on TV3 in early 2014, followed immediately by season 2. Netflix launched in New Zealand on March 24, 2015, and unlike Australia (which had Netflix launch on the same day) where House of Cards season 3 was available at launch, the series was initially unavailable.

In India, where Netflix was unavailable prior to January 2016, House of Cards premiered on February 20, 2014, on Zee Café. Seasons 1 and 2 were aired back–to–back. The channel aired all 13 episodes of season 3 on March 28 and 29, 2015. This marked the first time that an English-language general entertainment channel in India aired all episodes of the latest season of a series together. The move was intended to satisfy viewers' urge to binge-watch the season. Although Netflix launched in India in January 2016, House of Cards was not available on the service until March 4. All episodes of season 4 had their television premiere on Zee Café on March 12 and 13, 2016.

House of Cards was acquired by Canadian superstation CHCH for broadcast beginning September 13, 2017, making the program available throughout Canada on cable and free-to-air in CHCH's broadcast region, which includes portions of the United States. However, the show was removed from the CHCH primetime schedule two months later, following the sexual assault allegations towards Kevin Spacey.

House of Cards began airing in the United Kingdom on September 19, 2018, on Virgin TV Ultra HD, a newly established UHD/4K entertainment channel.

Home media
Season 1 was released on DVD and Blu-ray Disc by Sony Pictures Home Entertainment in region 1 on June 11, 2013, season 2 was released on June 17, 2014, season 3 was released on July 7, 2015, season 4 was released on July 5, 2016, season 5 was released on October 3, 2017, and season 6 was released on March 5, 2019.

Reception

Critical response

Season 1
The first season received positive reviews from critics. On Rotten Tomatoes, the first season holds a rating of 86%, based on 43 reviews, with an average rating of 8.21/10. The site's consensus reads, "Bolstered by strong performances — especially from Kevin Spacey — and surehanded direction, House of Cards is a slick, engrossing drama that may redefine how television is produced." On Metacritic, the first season has a score of 76 out of 100, based on 25 critics, indicating "generally favorable reviews".

USA Today critic Robert Bianco praised the series, particularly Spacey's and Wright's lead performances, stating "If you think network executives are nervous, imagine the actors who have to go up against that pair in the Emmys." Tom Gilatto of People Weekly lauded the first two episodes, calling them "cinematically rich, full of sleek, oily pools of darkness." In The Denver Post, critic Joanne Ostrow said the series is "[d]eeply cynical about human beings as well as politics and almost gleeful in its portrayal of limitless ambition". She added: "House of Cards is a wonderfully sour take on power and corruption."

Writing in The New York Times, critic Alessandra Stanley noted that the writing in the series sometimes fails to match the high quality of its acting: "Unfortunately Mr. Spacey's lines don't always live up to the subtle power of his performance; the writing isn't Shakespeare, or even Aaron Sorkin, and at times, it turns strangely trite." Nevertheless, she lauded House of Cards as an entertainment that "revels in the familiar but always entertaining underbelly of government." Andrew Davies, the writer of the original British TV series, stated that Spacey's character lacks the "charm" of Ian Richardson's, while The Independent praised Spacey's portrayal as a more "menacing" character, "hiding his rage behind Southern charm and old-fashioned courtesy." Randy Shaw, writing for The Huffington Post, criticized House of Cards for glorifying "union bashing and entitlement slashing within a political landscape whose absence of activist groups or anyone remotely progressive resembles a Republican fantasy world". Critics such as Time television critic James Poniewozik and Hank Stuever of The Washington Post compare the series to Boss. Like the UK show and novel of the same name, many critics have noted that it is heavily influenced by both Macbeth and Richard III. In addition, some critics find elements of Othello, such as Iago's bitter ire.

Season 2
The second season received positive reviews from critics. On Rotten Tomatoes the season has a rating of 84%, based on 45 reviews, with an average rating of 8.03/10. The site's critical consensus reads, "House of Cards proves just as bingeworthy in its second season, with more of the strong performances, writing, and visual design that made the first season so addictive." On Metacritic the season has a score of 80 out of 100, based on 25 critics, indicating "generally favorable reviews".

But as the season progressed, reviews became more mixed. Jen Chaney of Vulture wrote that the second season "felt kind of empty" and that "the closest it came to feeling emotionally rich was when it focused on Claire". At the end of the second season, Alan Sepinwall of HitFix wrote that the show is a "ridiculous political potboiler that takes itself too seriously"; he gave the overall season a C−.

Season 3
The third season received mostly positive reviews, although many critics noted it felt repetitive. On Rotten Tomatoes, the season has a rating of 74%, based on 54 reviews, with an average rating of 6.97/10. The site's consensus reads, "Season three introduces intriguing new political and personal elements to Frank Underwood's character, even if it feels like more of the same for some." On Metacritic, the season has a score of 76 out of 100, based on 24 critics, indicating "generally favorable reviews".

Negative reviews came from The Daily Beasts Nick Gillespie, who accused the writers of "descending into prosaic moralism" in season 3 and asserted that it deviates from the show's original intent, and Michael Wolff of USA Today plainly asserts that "the third season of House of Cards is no good ... not just no good, but incompetent, a shambles, lost". IndieWire named the season one of the most disappointing shows of 2015.

Season 4
The fourth season received positive reviews from critics. On Rotten Tomatoes, the season has a rating of 86%, based on 36 reviews, with an average rating of 7.69/10. The site's critical consensus reads, "House of Cards retains its binge-worthiness by ratcheting up the drama, and deepening Robin Wright's role even further." On Metacritic, the season has a score of 76 out of 100, based on 17 critics, indicating "generally favorable reviews".

Ben Travers of IndieWire had a positive response to season four, calling it an upgrade from what he perceived as a "messy and unsatisfying melodramatic" third season, writing that "House of Cards is aiming at authenticity, and–for what feels like the first time–consistently finding it."

Emily Van DerWerff of Vox had a mixed review to season four, criticizing the repetitive and predictable nature of the series, writing: "There's no such mystery with House of Cards, where you know exactly what will happen as surely as you do on NCIS. Obstacles will present themselves, but Frank (the hammy Kevin Spacey) and Claire (the almost perfect Robin Wright) Underwood will overcome. What you see is what you get."

The choice to have Frank and Claire run as running mates was highly criticized by some reviewers. Jonathan Holmes of Radio Times wrote that "there are limits to the stupidity viewers are willing to accept, and with season four [House of Cards] may have stepped over the line. Claire demanding her selection as Frank's running mate is stupid. Moronic. It turns a canny political operator into a ham-brained fish-eyed jar-opener." Spencer Kornhaber of The Atlantic wrote that "in moments like this it's good to remember that Cards really, fundamentally is a stupid TV show instead of a particularly cunning comment on political reality."

Season 5
The fifth season received mixed to positive reviews from critics. On Rotten Tomatoes, the season has an approval rating of 71% based on 45 reviews, with an average rating of 7.2/10. The site's critical consensus reads, "House of Cards enjoys a confident return to form this season, though its outlandish edge is tempered slightly by the current political climate." On Metacritic, the season has a score of 60 out of 100, based on 11 critics, indicating "mixed or average reviews".

After the fifth season received a Best Drama Series nomination at the 69th Primetime Emmy Awards, Brian Grubb of Uproxx wrote:

House of Cards has not been very good for multiple seasons now, if it was ever that good. I can understand the original excitement about it. Kevin Spacey and Robin Wright were on television. And not even "television," really. They were on a big budget series that was made for and by a streaming service. David Fincher was involved and even directed a few episodes. This was a borderline revolutionary development. ... I don't see how anyone who watched it can think it deserves a place in the best six or seven dramas on television.

Season 6
The sixth season received mixed reviews from critics, with many expressing disappointment over Kevin Spacey's absence. On Rotten Tomatoes, the season has an approval rating of 67% based on 66 reviews, with an average rating of 6.11/10. The website's critical consensus reads, "House of Cards folds slightly under the weight of its labyrinthian ending – thankfully Robin Wright's commanding performance is strong enough to keep it standing strong." On Metacritic, the season has a score of 62 out of 100, based on 23 critics, indicating "generally favorable reviews". In the U.S., the average season 6 viewership dropped from 1.9 million to 1.5 for the first week compared to the previous season.

The last season has also received negative reviews, including those related to the absence of Kevin Spacey.

Accolades

For its first season, House of Cards received nine nominations for the 65th Primetime Emmy Awards in 2013, to become the first original online-only streaming television series to receive major nominations. Among House of Cards&apos; nine nominations, "Chapter 1" received four nominations for the 65th Primetime Emmy Awards and 65th Primetime Creative Arts Emmy Awards becoming the first webisode (online-only episode) of a television series to receive a major Primetime Emmy Award nomination: Outstanding Directing for a Drama Series for David Fincher. This episode also received several Creative Arts Emmy Award nominations, including Outstanding Cinematography for a Single-Camera Series, Outstanding Single-Camera Picture Editing for a Drama Series, and Outstanding Music Composition for a Series (Original Dramatic). Although Primetime Emmy Award for Outstanding Lead Actor in a Drama Series is not a category that formally recognizes an episode, Spacey submitted "Chapter 1" for consideration to earn his nomination. At the Primetime Creative Arts Emmy Award presentation, "Chapter 1" and Eigil Bryld earned the Primetime Emmy Award for Outstanding Cinematography for a Single-Camera Series, making "Chapter 1" the first Emmy-awarded webisode. At the Primetime Emmy Awards ceremony, Fincher won for Outstanding Directing for a Drama Series for directing the pilot episode "Chapter 1" in addition to the pair of Creative Arts Emmy Awards, making "Chapter 1" the first Primetime Emmy-awarded webisode. None of the Emmy awards were considered to be in major categories.

For the 71st Golden Globe Awards, House of Cards received four nominations. Among those nominations was Wright for Golden Globe Award for Best Actress – Television Series Drama for her portrayal of Claire Underwood, which she won. In so doing she became the first actress to win a Golden Globe Award for an online-only streaming television series.

For its second season, House of Cards received 13 Primetime Emmy Award nominations, including Outstanding Drama Series, Kevin Spacey for Outstanding Lead Actor in a Drama Series, Robin Wright for Outstanding Lead Actress in a Drama Series, Kate Mara for Outstanding Guest Actress in a Drama Series, and Reg E. Cathey for Outstanding Guest Actor in a Drama Series. At the 72nd Golden Globe Awards, the series was nominated for Best Drama Series and Wright was nominated for Best Drama Actress, while Spacey won for Best Drama Actor.

Notes

References

External links

 
 
 
 House of Cards at Emmys.com

 
2010s American LGBT-related drama television series
2010s American political television series
2013 American television series debuts
2018 American television series endings
American political drama television series
American television series based on British television series
 3
English-language Netflix original programming
Peabody Award-winning television programs
Primetime Emmy Award-winning television series
Salary controversies in television
Serial drama television series
Television shows based on British novels
Television series by Media Rights Capital
Television series by Sony Pictures Television
Television shows set in Washington, D.C.
Television controversies in the United States